Fred Yancey was the head football coach at Briarwood Christian School in Birmingham, Alabama.

Yancey coached at Briarwood from 1991 until 2018 and is second all time in wins among Alabama high school football coaches. Briarwood has won three state titles under Yancey in 1998, 1999, and 2003, as well as advancing to the state championship game in 2007, 2010, and 2017. His record after the 2009 season was 211-77-1. He was also named to coach the Alabama team in the Alabama-Mississippi All-Star Game in 2010.

Yancey coached NFL players Tim Castille and Simeon Castille at Briarwood as well as former Auburn quarterback and NFL Offensive Coach Barrett Trotter.

On 27 November 2018 Coach Yancey announced his retirement as the Brairwood Christian School head football coach after 29 seasons.

References

High school football coaches in Alabama
Living people
Year of birth missing (living people)